The Toronto Track and Field Centre is a city-owned athletic training centre in Toronto, Ontario, Canada.  Prior to 1998 it was called Metro Toronto Track and Field Centre. It is located at York University's Keele campus in the north-west section of the city.

Description
The facility, while located at York, is not part of York University. The operation and programming of this facility is co-ordinated by a committee with members representing the City of Toronto, York University and the track and field community. It is home to the York Lions Track and Field Team and the York University Track Club. Opened in 1979, the facility is used by both professional and amateur athletes.

The indoor centre features:

 five-lane 200 metre banked oval track 
 eight-lane 100 metre sprint/hurdle runway with photo-timers booth 
 pole vaulting area (10 metre clearance) 
 two long jump/triple jump runways 
 two high jump areas 
 discus throwing area with curtain 
 shot-put throwing circle 
 warm-up area 
 three-lane 30 metre warm-up, sprint and hurdle runways 
 training facility containing light, heavy, and Olympic free weights 
 two universal gyms 
 two meeting rooms 
 observation gallery
 locker rooms with showers 
 first aid area

The outdoor centre features:

 eight-lane rubberized 400 metre Olympic regulation track with two 125-metre sprint/hurdle runways, adjustable steeple chase barriers
 full outdoor facilities for track meets 
 outdoor photo-timers booth with public address system 
  practice throwing paddock for javelin, discus, shot-put, and hammer events 
 Alan Eagleson Sports Injuries Clinic

See also

 Birchmount Stadium
 Centennial Park Stadium
 Esther Shiner Stadium
 Lamport Stadium
 Monarch Park Stadium
 Rosedale Field
 Varsity Stadium
 York Lions Stadium

References

External links
 

Sports venues in Toronto
Athletics (track and field) venues in Ontario
York University buildings